Calbha Beag is an uninhabited island in Eddrachillis Bay, off Sutherland, Highland, Scotland. It is immediately to the west of Calbha Mor.

Notes

References
 

Islands of Sutherland
Uninhabited islands of Highland (council area)